Panj Maneh (also known as Panj Shanbeh) is a village in Kardeh Rural District, in the Central District of Mashhad County, Razavi Khorasan Province, Iran. At the 2006 census, its population was 36, in 7 families.

References 

Populated places in Mashhad County